In economics, hyperinflation is a very high and typically accelerating inflation. It quickly erodes the real value of the local currency, as the prices of all goods increase. This causes people to minimize their holdings in that currency as they usually switch to more stable foreign currencies. When measured in stable foreign currencies, prices typically remain stable.

Unlike low inflation, where the process of rising prices is protracted and not generally noticeable except by studying past market prices, hyperinflation sees a rapid and continuing increase in nominal prices, the nominal cost of goods, and in the supply of currency. Typically, however, the general price level rises even more rapidly than the money supply as people try ridding themselves of the devaluing currency as quickly as possible. As this happens, the real stock of money (i.e., the amount of circulating money divided by the price level) decreases considerably.

Hyperinflation is often associated with some stress to the government budget, such as wars or their aftermath, sociopolitical upheavals, a collapse in aggregate supply or one in export prices, or other crises that make it difficult for the government to collect tax revenue. A sharp decrease in real tax revenue coupled with a strong need to maintain government spending, together with an inability or unwillingness to borrow, can lead a country into hyperinflation.

Definition

In 1956, Phillip Cagan wrote The Monetary Dynamics of Hyperinflation, the book often regarded as the first serious study of hyperinflation and its effects (though The Economics of Inflation by C. Bresciani-Turroni on the German hyperinflation was published in Italian in 1931). In his book, Cagan defined a hyperinflationary episode as starting in the month that the monthly inflation rate exceeds 50%, and as ending when the monthly inflation rate drops below 50% and stays that way for at least a year. Economists usually follow Cagan's description that hyperinflation occurs when the monthly inflation rate exceeds 50% (this is equivalent to a yearly rate of 12974.63%).

The International Accounting Standards Board has issued guidance on accounting rules in a hyperinflationary environment. It does not establish an absolute rule on when hyperinflation arises, but instead lists factors that indicate the existence of hyperinflation:
 The general population prefers to keep its wealth in non-monetary assets or in a relatively stable foreign currency. Amounts of local currency held are immediately invested to maintain purchasing power;
 The general population regards monetary amounts not in terms of the local currency but in terms of a relatively stable foreign currency. Prices may be quoted in that currency;
 Sales and purchases on credit take place at prices that compensate for the expected loss of purchasing power during the credit period, even if the period is short;
 Interest rates, wages, and prices are linked to a price index; and
 The cumulative inflation rate over three years approaches, or exceeds, 100%.

Causes
While there can be a number of causes of high inflation, almost all hyperinflations have been caused by government budget deficits financed by currency creation. Peter Bernholz analysed 29 hyperinflations (following Cagan's definition) and concludes that at least 25 of them have been caused in this way. A necessary condition for hyperinflation is the use of paper money instead of gold or silver coins. Most hyperinflations in history, with some exceptions, such as the French hyperinflation of 1789–1796, occurred after the use of fiat currency became widespread in the late 19th century. The French hyperinflation took place after the introduction of a non-convertible paper currency, the assignat.

Money supply
Monetarist theories hold that hyperinflation occurs when there is a continuing (and often accelerating) rapid increase in the amount of money that is not supported by a corresponding growth in the output of goods and services.

The increases in price that can result from rapid money creation can create a vicious circle, requiring ever growing amounts of new money creation to fund government deficits. Hence both monetary inflation and price inflation proceed at a rapid pace. Such rapidly increasing prices cause widespread unwillingness of the local population to hold the local currency as it rapidly loses its buying power. Instead, they quickly spend any money they receive, which increases the velocity of money flow; this in turn causes further acceleration in prices. This means that the increase in the price level is greater than that of the money supply. The real stock of money, M/P, decreases. Here M refers to the money stock and P to the price level.

This results in an imbalance between the supply and demand for the money (including currency and bank deposits), causing rapid inflation. Very high inflation rates can result in a loss of confidence in the currency, similar to a bank run. Usually, the excessive money supply growth results from the government being either unable or unwilling to fully finance the government budget through taxation or borrowing, and instead it finances the government budget deficit through the printing of money.

Governments have sometimes resorted to excessively loose monetary policy, as it allows a government to devalue its debts and reduce (or avoid) a tax increase. Monetary inflation is effectively a flat tax on creditors that also redistributes proportionally to private debtors. Distributional effects of monetary inflation are complex and vary based on the situation, with some models finding regressive effects but other empirical studies progressive effects. As a form of tax, it is less overt than levied taxes and is therefore harder to understand by ordinary citizens. Inflation can obscure quantitative assessments of the true cost of living, as published price indices only look at data in retrospect, so may increase only months later. Monetary inflation can become hyperinflation if monetary authorities fail to fund increasing government expenses from taxes, government debt, cost cutting, or by other means, because either
 during the time between recording or levying taxable transactions and collecting the taxes due, the value of the taxes collected falls in real value to a small fraction of the original taxes receivable; or
 government debt issues fail to find buyers except at very deep discounts; or
 a combination of the above.

Theories of hyperinflation generally look for a relationship between seigniorage and the inflation tax. In both Cagan's model and the neo-classical models, a tipping point occurs when the increase in money supply or the drop in the monetary base makes it impossible for a government to improve its financial position. Thus when fiat money is printed, government obligations that are not denominated in money increase in cost by more than the value of the money created.

From this, it might be wondered why any rational government would engage in actions that cause or continue hyperinflation. One reason for such actions is that often the alternative to hyperinflation is either depression or military defeat. The root cause is a matter of more dispute. In both classical economics and monetarism, it is always the result of the monetary authority irresponsibly borrowing money to pay all its expenses. These models focus on the unrestrained seigniorage of the monetary authority, and the gains from the inflation tax.

In neo-classical economic theory, hyperinflation is rooted in a deterioration of the monetary base, that is the confidence that there is a store of value that the currency will be able to command later. In this model, the perceived risk of holding currency rises dramatically, and sellers demand increasingly high premiums to accept the currency. This in turn leads to a greater fear that the currency will collapse, causing even higher premiums. One example of this is during periods of warfare, civil war, or intense internal conflict of other kinds: governments need to do whatever is necessary to continue fighting, since the alternative is defeat. Expenses cannot be cut significantly since the main outlay is armaments. Further, a civil war may make it difficult to raise taxes or to collect existing taxes. While in peacetime the deficit is financed by selling bonds, during a war it is typically difficult and expensive to borrow, especially if the war is going poorly for the government in question. The banking authorities, whether central or not, "monetize" the deficit, printing money to pay for the government's efforts to survive. The hyperinflation under the Chinese Nationalists from 1939 to 1945 is a classic example of a government printing money to pay civil war costs. By the end, currency was flown in over the Himalayas, and then old currency was flown out to be destroyed.

Hyperinflation is a complex phenomenon and one explanation may not be applicable to all cases. In both of these models, however, whether loss of confidence comes first, or central bank seigniorage, the other phase is ignited. In the case of rapid expansion of the money supply, prices rise rapidly in response to the increased supply of money relative to the supply of goods and services, and in the case of loss of confidence, the monetary authority responds to the risk premiums it has to pay by "running the printing presses".

Supply shocks
A number of hyperinflations were caused by some sort of extreme negative supply shock, sometimes but not always associated with wars or natural disasters.

Models
Since hyperinflation is visible as a monetary effect, models of hyperinflation center on the demand for money. Economists see both a rapid increase in the money supply and an increase in the velocity of money if the (monetary) inflating is not stopped. Either one, or both of these together are the root causes of inflation and hyperinflation. A dramatic increase in the velocity of money as the cause of hyperinflation is central to the "crisis of confidence" model of hyperinflation, where the risk premium that sellers demand for the paper currency over the nominal value grows rapidly. The second theory is that there is first a radical increase in the amount of circulating medium, which can be called the "monetary model" of hyperinflation. In either model, the second effect then follows from the first—either too little confidence forcing an increase in the money supply, or too much money destroying confidence.

In the confidence model, some event, or series of events, such as defeats in battle, or a run on stocks of the specie that back a currency, removes the belief that the authority issuing the money will remain solvent—whether a bank or a government. Because people do not want to hold notes that may become valueless, they want to spend them. Sellers, realizing that there is a higher risk for the currency, demand a greater and greater premium over the original value. Under this model, the method of ending hyperinflation is to change the backing of the currency, often by issuing a completely new one. War is one commonly cited cause of crisis of confidence, particularly losing in a war, as occurred during Napoleonic Vienna, and capital flight, sometimes because of "contagion" is another. In this view, the increase in the circulating medium is the result of the government attempting to buy time without coming to terms with the root cause of the lack of confidence itself.

In the monetary model, hyperinflation is a positive feedback cycle of rapid monetary expansion. It has the same cause as all other inflation: money-issuing bodies, central or otherwise, produce currency to pay spiraling costs, often from lax fiscal policy, or the mounting costs of warfare. When business people perceive that the issuer is committed to a policy of rapid currency expansion, they mark up prices to cover the expected decay in the currency's value. The issuer must then accelerate its expansion to cover these prices, which pushes the currency value down even faster than before. According to this model the issuer cannot "win" and the only solution is to abruptly stop expanding the currency. Unfortunately, the end of expansion can cause a severe financial shock to those using the currency as expectations are suddenly adjusted. This policy, combined with reductions of pensions, wages, and government outlays, formed part of the Washington consensus of the 1990s.

Whatever the cause, hyperinflation involves both the supply and velocity of money. Which comes first is a matter of debate, and there may be no universal story that applies to all cases. But once the hyperinflation is established, the pattern of increasing the money stock, by whichever agencies are allowed to do so, is universal. Because this practice increases the supply of currency without any matching increase in demand for it, the price of the currency, that is the exchange rate, naturally falls relative to other currencies. Inflation becomes hyperinflation when the increase in money supply turns specific areas of pricing power into a general frenzy of spending quickly before money becomes worthless. The purchasing power of the currency drops so rapidly that holding cash for even a day is an unacceptable loss of purchasing power. As a result, no one holds currency, which increases the velocity of money, and worsens the crisis.

Because rapidly rising prices undermine the role of money as a store of value, people try to spend it on real goods or services as quickly as possible. Thus, the monetary model predicts that the velocity of money will increase as a result of an excessive increase in the money supply. At the point when money velocity and prices rapidly accelerate in a vicious circle, hyperinflation is out of control, because ordinary policy mechanisms, such as increasing reserve requirements, raising interest rates, or cutting government spending will be ineffective and be responded to by shifting away from the rapidly devalued money and towards other means of exchange.

During a period of hyperinflation, bank runs, loans for 24-hour periods, switching to alternate currencies, the return to use of gold or silver or even barter become common. Many of the people who hoard gold today expect hyperinflation, and are hedging against it by holding specie. There may also be extensive capital flight or flight to a "hard" currency such as the US dollar. This is sometimes met with capital controls, an idea that has swung from standard, to anathema, and back into semi-respectability. All of this constitutes an economy that is operating in an "abnormal" way, which may lead to decreases in real production. If so, that intensifies the hyperinflation, since it means that the amount of goods in "too much money chasing too few goods" formulation is also reduced. This is also part of the vicious circle of hyperinflation.

Once the vicious circle of hyperinflation has been ignited, dramatic policy means are almost always required. Simply raising interest rates is insufficient. Bolivia, for example, underwent a period of hyperinflation in 1985, where prices increased 12,000% in the space of less than a year. The government raised the price of gasoline, which it had been selling at a huge loss to quiet popular discontent, and the hyperinflation came to a halt almost immediately, since it was able to bring in hard currency by selling its oil abroad. The crisis of confidence ended, and people returned deposits to banks. The German hyperinflation (1919 – November 1923) was ended by producing a currency based on assets loaned against by banks, called the Rentenmark. Hyperinflation often ends when a civil conflict ends with one side winning.

Although wage and price controls are sometimes used to control or prevent inflation, no episode of hyperinflation has been ended by the use of price controls alone, because price controls that force merchants to sell at prices far below their restocking costs result in shortages that cause prices to rise still further.

Nobel prize winner Milton Friedman said "We economists don't know much, but we do know how to create a shortage. If you want to create a shortage of tomatoes, for example, just pass a law that retailers can't sell tomatoes for more than two cents per pound. Instantly you'll have a tomato shortage. It's the same with oil or gas."

Effects

Hyperinflation increases stock market prices, wipes out the purchasing power of private and public savings, distorts the economy in favor of the hoarding of real assets, causes the monetary base (whether specie or hard currency) to flee the country, and makes the afflicted area anathema to investment.

One of the most important characteristics of hyperinflation is the accelerating substitution of the inflating money by stable money—gold and silver in former times, then relatively stable foreign currencies after the breakdown of the gold or silver standards (Thiers' Law). If inflation is high enough, government regulations like heavy penalties and fines, often combined with exchange controls, cannot prevent this currency substitution. As a consequence, the inflating currency is usually heavily undervalued compared to stable foreign money in terms of purchasing power parity. So foreigners can live cheaply and buy at low prices in the countries hit by high inflation. It follows that governments that do not succeed in engineering a successful currency reform in time must finally legalize the stable foreign currencies (or, formerly, gold and silver) that threaten to fully substitute the inflating money. Otherwise, their tax revenues, including the inflation tax, will approach zero. The last episode of hyperinflation in which this process could be observed was in Zimbabwe in the first decade of the 21st century. In this case, the local money was mainly driven out by the US dollar and the South African rand.

Enactment of price controls to prevent discounting the value of paper money relative to gold, silver, hard currency, or other commodities fail to force acceptance of a paper money that lacks intrinsic value. If the entity responsible for printing a currency promotes excessive money printing, with other factors contributing a reinforcing effect, hyperinflation usually continues. Hyperinflation is generally associated with paper money, which can easily be used to increase the money supply: add more zeros to the plates and print, or even stamp old notes with new numbers. Historically, there have been numerous episodes of hyperinflation in various countries followed by a return to "hard money". Older economies would revert to hard currency and barter when the circulating medium became excessively devalued, generally following a "run" on the store of value.

Much attention on hyperinflation centers on the effect on savers whose investments become worthless. Interest rate changes often cannot keep up with hyperinflation or even high inflation, certainly with contractually fixed interest rates. For example, in the 1970s in the United Kingdom inflation reached 25% per annum, yet interest rates did not rise above 15%—and then only briefly—and many fixed interest rate loans existed. Contractually, there is often no bar to a debtor clearing his long term debt with "hyperinflated cash", nor could a lender simply somehow suspend the loan. Contractual "early redemption penalties" were (and still are) often based on a penalty of n months of interest/payment; again no real bar to paying off what had been a large loan. In interwar Germany, for example, much private and corporate debt was effectively wiped out—certainly for those holding fixed interest rate loans.

Ludwig von Mises used the term "crack-up boom" (German: Katastrophenhausse) to describe the economic consequences of an unmitigated increasing in the base-money supply. As more and more money is provided, interest rates decline towards zero. Realizing that fiat money is losing value, investors will try to place money in assets such as real estate, stocks, even art; as these appear to represent "real" value. Asset prices are thus becoming inflated. This potentially spiraling process will ultimately lead to the collapse of the monetary system. The Cantillon effect says that those institutions that receive the new money first are the beneficiaries of the policy.

Aftermath
Hyperinflation is ended by drastic remedies, such as imposing the shock therapy of slashing government expenditures or altering the currency basis. One form this may take is dollarization, the use of a foreign currency (not necessarily the U.S. dollar) as a national unit of currency. An example was dollarization in Ecuador, initiated in September 2000 in response to a 75% loss of value of the Ecuadorian sucre in early 2000. Usually the "dollarization" takes place in spite of all efforts of the government to prevent it by exchange controls, heavy fines and penalties. The government has thus to try to engineer a successful currency reform stabilizing the value of the money. If it does not succeed with this reform the substitution of the inflating by stable money goes on. Thus it is not surprising that there have been at least seven historical cases in which the good (foreign) money did fully drive out the use of the inflating currency. In the end, the government had to legalize the former, for otherwise its revenues would have fallen to zero.

Hyperinflation has always been a traumatic experience for the people who suffer it, and the next political regime almost always enacts policies to try to prevent its recurrence. Often this means making the central bank very aggressive about maintaining price stability, as was the case with the German Bundesbank, or moving to some hard basis of currency, such as a currency board. Many governments have enacted extremely stiff wage and price controls in the wake of hyperinflation, but this does not prevent further inflation of the money supply by the central bank, and always leads to widespread shortages of consumer goods if the controls are rigidly enforced.

Currency
In countries experiencing hyperinflation, the central bank often prints money in larger and larger denominations as the smaller denomination notes become worthless. This can result in the production of unusually large denominations of banknotes, including those denominated in amounts of 1,000,000,000 or more.
 By late 1923, the Weimar Republic of Germany was issuing two-trillion mark banknotes and postage stamps with a face value of fifty billion marks. The highest value banknote issued by the Weimar government's Reichsbank had a face value of 100 trillion marks (1014; 100,000,000,000,000; 100 million million). At the height of the inflation, one US dollar was worth 4 trillion German marks. One of the firms printing these notes submitted an invoice for the work to the Reichsbank for 32,776,899,763,734,490,417.05 (3.28 × 1019, roughly 33 quintillion) marks.
 The largest denomination banknote ever officially issued for circulation was in 1946 by the Hungarian National Bank for the amount of 100 quintillion pengő (1020; 100,000,000,000,000,000,000; 100 million million million) image. (A banknote worth 10 times as much, 1021 (1 sextillion) pengő, was printed but not issued image.) The banknotes did not show the numbers in full: "hundred million b.-pengő" ("hundred million trillion pengő") and "one milliard b.-pengő" were spelled out instead. This makes the 100,000,000,000,000 Zimbabwean dollar banknotes the note with the greatest number of zeros shown.
 The Post-World War II hyperinflation of Hungary held the record for the most extreme monthly inflation rate ever – 41.9 quadrillion percent (4.19 × 1016%; 41,900,000,000,000,000%) for July 1946, amounting to prices doubling every 15.3 hours. By comparison, on 14 November 2008, Zimbabwe's annual inflation rate was estimated to be 89.7 sextillion (1021) percent. The highest monthly inflation rate of that period was 79.6 billion percent (7.96 × 1010%; 79,600,000,000%), and a doubling time of 24.7 hours.

One way to avoid the use of large numbers is by declaring a new unit of currency. (As an example, instead of 10,000,000,000 dollars, a central bank might set 1 new dollar = 1,000,000,000 old dollars, so the new note would read "10 new dollars".) One example of this is Turkey's revaluation of the Lira on 1 January 2005, when the old Turkish lira (TRL) was converted to the New Turkish lira (TRY) at a rate of 1,000,000 old to 1 new Turkish Lira. While this does not lessen the actual value of a currency, it is called redenomination or revaluation and also occasionally happens in countries with lower inflation rates. During hyperinflation, currency inflation happens so quickly that bills reach large numbers before revaluation.

Some banknotes were stamped to indicate changes of denomination, as it would have taken too long to print new notes. By the time new notes were printed, they would be obsolete (that is, they would be of too low a denomination to be useful).

Metallic coins were rapid casualties of hyperinflation, as the scrap value of metal enormously exceeded its face value. Massive amounts of coinage were melted down, usually illicitly, and exported for hard currency.

Governments will often try to disguise the true rate of inflation through a variety of techniques. None of these actions addresses the root causes of inflation; and if discovered, they tend to further undermine trust in the currency, causing further increases in inflation. Price controls will generally result in shortages and hoarding and extremely high demand for the controlled goods, causing disruptions of supply chains. Products available to consumers may diminish or disappear as businesses no longer find it economic to continue producing and/or distributing such goods at the legal prices, further exacerbating the shortages.

There are also issues with computerized money-handling systems. In Zimbabwe, during the hyperinflation of the Zimbabwe dollar, many automated teller machines and payment card machines struggled with arithmetic overflow errors as customers required many billions and trillions of dollars at one time.

Notable hyperinflationary periods

Argentina

Austria

In 1922, inflation in Austria reached 1,426%, and from 1914 to January 1923, the consumer price index rose by a factor of 11,836, with the highest banknote in denominations of 500,000 Kronen. After World War I, essentially all State enterprises ran at a loss, and the number of state employees in the capital, Vienna, was greater than in the earlier monarchy, even though the new republic was nearly one-eighth of the size.

Observing the Austrian response to developing hyperinflation, which included the hoarding of food and the speculation in foreign currencies, Owen S. Phillpotts, the Commercial Secretary at the British Legation in Vienna wrote: "The Austrians are like men on a ship who cannot manage it, and are continually signalling for help. While waiting, however, most of them begin to cut rafts, each for himself, out of the sides and decks. The ship has not yet sunk despite the leaks so caused, and those who have acquired stores of wood in this way may use them to cook their food, while the more seamanlike look on cold and hungry. The population lack courage and energy as well as patriotism."
 Start and end date: October 1921 – September 1923
 Peak month and rate of inflation: August 1922, 129%

Bolivia 
Increasing hyperinflation in Bolivia has plagued, and at times crippled, its economy and currency since the 1970s. At one time in 1985, the country experienced an annual inflation rate of more than 20,000%. Fiscal and monetary reform reduced the inflation rate to single digits by the 1990s, and in 2004 Bolivia experienced a manageable 4.9% rate of inflation.

In 1987, the Bolivian peso was replaced by the new boliviano at a rate of one million to one (when 1 US dollar was worth 1.8–1.9 million pesos). At that time, 1 new boliviano was roughly equivalent to 1 U.S. dollar.

Brazil 

Brazilian hyperinflation lasted from 1985 (the year when the military dictatorship ended) to 1994, with prices rising by 184,901,570,954.39% (or  percent; equivalent to a tenfold increase on average a year) in that time due to the uncontrolled printing of money. There were many economic plans that tried to contain hyperinflation including zeroes cuts, price freezes and even confiscation of bank accounts.

The highest value was in March 1990, when the government inflation index reached 82.39%. Hyperinflation ended in July 1994 with the Real Plan during the government of Itamar Franco. During the period of inflation Brazil adopted a total of six different currencies, as the government constantly changed due to rapid devaluation and increase in the number of zeros.
 Start and End Date: Jan. 1985 – Mid-Jul. 1994
 Peak Month and Rate of Inflation: Mar. 1990, 82.39%

China
From 1948 to 1949, near the end of the Chinese Civil War, the Republic of China went through a period of hyperinflation. In 1947, the highest denomination bill was 50,000 yuan. By mid-1948, the highest denomination was 180,000,000 yuan. The 1948 currency reform replaced the yuan by the gold yuan at an exchange rate of 1 gold yuan = 3,000,000 yuan. In less than a year, the highest denomination was 10,000,000 gold yuan. In the final days of the civil war, the silver yuan was briefly introduced at the rate of 500,000,000 gold yuan. Meanwhile, the highest denomination issued by a regional bank was 6,000,000,000 yuan (issued by Xinjiang Provincial Bank in 1949). After renminbi was instituted by the new communist government, hyperinflation ceased, with a revaluation of 1:10,000 old yuan in 1955.
First episode:
 Start and end date: July 1943 – August 1945
 Peak month and rate of inflation: June 1945, 302%
Second episode:
 Start and end date: October 1947 – mid May 1949
 Peak month and rate of inflation: April 5,070%

France
During the French Revolution and first Republic, the National Assembly issued bonds, some backed by seized church property, called assignats. Napoleon replaced them with the franc in 1803, at which time the assignats were basically worthless. Stephen D. Dillaye pointed out that one of the reasons for the failure was massive counterfeiting of the paper currency, largely through London. According to Dillaye: "Seventeen manufacturing establishments were in full operation in London, with a force of four hundred men devoted to the production of false and forged Assignats."
 Start and end date: May 1795 – November 1796
 Peak month and rate of inflation: mid August 1796, 304%

Germany (Weimar Republic)

By November 1922, the value in gold of money in circulation had fallen from £300 million stg before World War I to £20 million. The Reichsbank responded by the unlimited printing of notes, thereby accelerating the devaluation of the mark. In his report to London, Lord D'Abernon wrote: "In the whole course of history, no dog has ever run after its own tail with the speed of the Reichsbank." Germany went through its worst inflation in 1923. In 1922, the highest denomination was 50,000ℳ. By 1923, the highest denomination was 100,000,000,000,000ℳ (1014 marks). In December 1923 the exchange rate was 4,200,000,000,000ℳ (4.2 × 1012 marks) to 1 US dollar. In 1923, the rate of inflation hit 3.25 × 106 percent per month (prices double every two days). Beginning on 20 November 1923, 1,000,000,000,000ℳ were exchanged for 1 Rentenmark, so that RM 4.2 was worth 1 US dollar, exactly the same rate the mark had in 1914.
First phase:
 Start and end date: January 1920 – January 1920
 Peak month and rate of inflation: January 1920, 56.9%
Second phase:
 Start and end date: August 1922 – December 1923
 Peak month and rate of inflation: November 1923, 29,525%

Greece (German–Italian occupation)
With the German invasion in April 1941, there was an abrupt increase in prices. This was due to psychological factors related to the fear of shortages and to the hoarding of goods. During the German and Italian Axis occupation of Greece (1941–1944), the agricultural, mineral, industrial etc. production of Greece were used to sustain the occupation forces, but also to secure provisions for the Afrika Korps. One part of these "sales" of provisions was settled with bilateral clearing through the German DEGRIGES and the Italian Sagic companies at very low prices. As the value of Greek exports in drachmas fell, the demand for drachmas followed suit and so did its forex rate. While shortages started due to naval blockades and hoarding, the prices of commodities soared. The other part of the "purchases" was settled with drachmas secured from the Bank of Greece and printed for this purpose by private printing presses. As prices soared, the Germans and Italians started requesting more and more drachmas from the Bank of Greece to offset price increases; each time prices increased, the note circulation followed suit soon afterwards. For the year starting November 1943, the inflation rate was 2.5 × 1010%, the circulation was 6.28 × 1018 drachmae and one gold sovereign cost 43,167 billion drachmas. The hyperinflation started subsiding immediately after the departure of the German occupation forces, but inflation rates took several years to fall below 50%.
 Start and end date: June 1941 – January 1946
 Peak month and rate of inflation: December 1944, %

Hungary

The Treaty of Trianon and political instability between 1919 and 1924 led to a major inflation of Hungary's currency. In 1921, in an attempt to stop this inflation, the national assembly of Hungary passed the Hegedüs reforms, including a 20% levy on bank deposits, but this precipitated a mistrust of banks by the public, especially the peasants, and resulted in a reduction in savings, and thus an increase in the amount of currency in circulation. Due to the reduced tax base, the government resorted to printing money, and in 1923 inflation in Hungary reached 98% per month.

Between the end of 1945 and July 1946, Hungary went through the highest inflation ever recorded. In 1944, the highest banknote value was 1,000 P. By the end of 1945, it was 10,000,000 P, and the highest value in mid-1946 was 100,000,000,000,000,000,000 P (1020 pengő). A special currency, the adópengő (or tax pengő) was created for tax and postal payments. The inflation was such that the value of the adópengő was adjusted each day by radio announcement. On 1 January 1946, one adópengő equaled one pengő, but by late July, one adópengő equaled 2,000,000,000,000,000,000,000 P or 2×1021 P (2 sextillion pengő).

Inflation had peaked at 1.3 × 1016% per month (i.e. prices doubled every 15.6 hours). On 18 August 1946, 400,000,000,000,000,000,000,000,000,000 P (4 pengő, four hundred quadrilliard on the long scale used in Hungary, or four hundred octillion on short scale) became 1 Ft.
 Start and end date: August 1945 – July 1946
 Peak month and rate of inflation: July 1946, %

Malaya (Japanese occupation)

Malaya and Singapore were under Japanese occupation from 1942 until 1945. The Japanese issued "banana notes" as the official currency to replace the Straits currency issued by the British. During that time, the cost of basic necessities increased drastically. As the occupation proceeded, the Japanese authorities printed more money to fund their wartime activities, which resulted in hyperinflation and a severe depreciation in value of the banana note.

From February to December 1942, $100 of Straits currency was worth $100 in Japanese scrip, after which the value of Japanese scrip began to erode, reaching $385 in December 1943 and $1,850 one year later. By 1 August 1945, this had inflated to $10,500, and 11 days later it had reached $95,000. After 13 August 1945, Japanese scrip had become valueless.

North Korea
North Korea has most likely experienced hyperinflation from December 2009 to mid-January 2011. Based on the price of rice, North Korea's hyperinflation peaked in mid-January 2010, but according to black market exchange-rate data, and calculations based on purchasing power parity, North Korea experienced its peak month of inflation in early March 2010. These data points are unofficial, however, and therefore must be treated with a degree of caution.

Peru 

In modern history, Peru underwent a period of hyperinflation in the 1980s to the early 1990s starting with President Fernando Belaúnde's second administration, heightened during Alan García's first administration, to the beginning of Alberto Fujimori's term. 1 US dollar was worth over S/3,210,000,000. Garcia's term introduced the inti, which worsened inflation into hyperinflation. Peru's currency and economy were stabilized under Fujimori's Nuevo Sol program, which has remained Peru's currency since 1991.

Poland
Poland has gone through two episodes of hyperinflation since the country regained independence following the end of World War I, the first in 1923, the second in 1989–1990. Both events resulted in the introduction of new currencies. In 1924, the złoty replaced the original currency of post-war Poland, the mark. This currency was subsequently replaced by another of the same name in 1950. As a result of the second hyperinflation crisis, the current new złoty was introduced in 1995 (ISO code: PLN). See the article on Polish złoty for more information about the currency's history.

The newly independent Poland had been struggling with a large budget deficit since its inception in 1918 but it was in 1923 when inflation reached its peak. The exchange rate of the Polish mark (Mp) to the US dollar dropped from Mp 9.- per dollar in 1918 to Mp 6,375,000.- per dollar at the end of 1923. A new personal 'inflation tax' was introduced. The resolution of the crisis is attributed to Władysław Grabski, who became prime minister of Poland in December 1923. Having nominated an all-new government and being granted extraordinary lawmaking powers by the Sejm for a period of six months, he introduced a new currency, the złoty ("florin" in Polish), established a new national bank and scrapped the inflation tax, which took place throughout 1924.

The economic crisis in Poland in the 1980s was accompanied by rising inflation when new money was printed to cover a budget deficit. Although inflation was not as acute as in 1920s, it is estimated that its annual rate reached around 600% in a period of over a year spanning parts of 1989 and 1990. The economy was stabilised by the adoption of the Balcerowicz Plan in 1989, named after the main author of the reforms, minister of finance Leszek Balcerowicz. The plan was largely inspired by the previous Grabski's reforms.

Philippines
The Japanese government occupying the Philippines during World War II issued fiat currencies for general circulation. The Japanese-sponsored Second Philippine Republic government led by Jose P. Laurel at the same time outlawed possession of other currencies, most especially "guerrilla money". The fiat money's lack of value earned it the derisive nickname "Mickey Mouse money". Survivors of the war often tell tales of bringing suitcases or bayong (native bags made of woven coconut or buri leaf strips) overflowing with Japanese-issued notes. Early on, 75 JIM pesos could buy one duck egg. In 1944, a box of matches cost more than 100 JIM pesos.

In 1942, the highest denomination available was ₱10. Before the end of the war, because of inflation, the Japanese government was forced to issue ₱100, ₱500, and ₱1,000 notes.
 Start and end date: January 1944 – December 1944
 Peak month and rate of inflation: January 1944, 60%

Soviet Union

A seven-year period of uncontrollable spiralling inflation occurred in the early Soviet Union, running from the earliest days of the Bolshevik Revolution in November 1917 to the reestablishment of the gold standard with the introduction of the chervonets as part of the New Economic Policy. The inflationary crisis effectively ended in March 1924 with the introduction of the so-called "gold ruble" as the country's standard currency.

The early Soviet hyperinflationary period was marked by three successive redenominations of its currency, in which "new rubles" replaced old at the rates of 10,000:1 (1 January 1922), 100:1 (1 January 1923), and 50,000:1 (7 March 1924), respectively.

Between 1921 and 1922, inflation in the Soviet Union reached 213%.

Turkey

Since the end of 2017 Turkey has high inflation rates. It is speculated that the new elections took place frustrated because of the impending crisis to forestall. In October 2017, inflation was at 11.9%, the highest rate since July 2008. The lira fell from TL 1.503 = US$1 in 2010 to TL 18.0664 = US$1 in August 2022.

In February 2022 the inflation rose to 54.4%. In March 2022, the inflation was even above 60%.

Venezuela 

Venezuela's hyperinflation began in November 2016. Inflation of Venezuela's bolivar fuerte (VEF) in 2014 reached 69% and was the highest in the world. In 2015, inflation was 181%, the highest in the world and the highest in the country's history at that time, 800% in 2016, over 4,000% in 2017, and 1,698,488% in 2018, with Venezuela spiraling into hyperinflation. While the Venezuelan government "has essentially stopped" producing official inflation estimates as of early 2018, one estimate of the rate at that time was 5,220%, according to inflation economist Steve Hanke of Johns Hopkins University.

Inflation has affected Venezuelans so much that in 2017, some people became video game gold farmers and could be seen playing games such as RuneScape to sell in-game currency or characters for real currency. In many cases, these gamers made more money than salaried workers in Venezuela even though they were earning just a few dollars per day. During the Christmas season of 2017, some shops would no longer use price tags since prices would inflate so quickly, so customers were required to ask staff at stores how much each item was.

The International Monetary Fund estimated in 2018 that Venezuela's inflation rate would reach 1,000,000% by the end of the year. This forecast was criticized by Steve H. Hanke, professor of applied economics at The Johns Hopkins University and senior fellow at the Cato Institute. According to Hanke, the IMF had released a "bogus forecast" because "no one has ever been able to accurately forecast the course or the duration of an episode of hyperinflation. But that has not stopped the IMF from offering inflation forecasts for Venezuela that have proven to be wildly inaccurate".

In July 2018, hyperinflation in Venezuela was sitting at 33,151%, "the 23rd most severe episode of hyperinflation in history".

In April 2019, the International Monetary Fund estimated that inflation would reach 10,000,000% by the end of 2019.

In May 2019, the Central Bank of Venezuela released economic data for the first time since 2015. According to this release, the inflation of Venezuela was 274% in 2016, 863% in 2017 and 130,060% in 2018. The annualised inflation rate as of April 2019 was estimated to be 282,972.8% as of April 2019, and cumulative inflation from 2016 to April 2019 was estimated at 53,798,500%.

The new reports imply a contraction of more than half of the economy in five years, according to the Financial Times "one of the biggest contractions in Latin American history". According to undisclosed sources from Reuters, the release of these numbers was due to pressure from China, a Maduro ally. One of these sources claims that the disclosure of economic numbers may bring Venezuela into compliance with the IMF, making it harder to support Juan Guaidó during the presidential crisis. At the time, the IMF was not able to support the validity of the data as they had not been able to contact the authorities.
 Start and end date: November 2016 – present
 Peak month and rate of inflation: April 2018, 234% (Hanke estimate); September 2018, 233% (National Assembly estimate)

Vietnam
Vietnam went through a period of chaos and high inflation in the late 1980s, with inflation peaking at 774% in 1988, after the country's "price-wage-currency" reform package, led by then-Deputy Prime Minister Trần Phương, had failed. High inflation also occurred in the early stages of the socialist-oriented market economic reforms commonly referred to as the Đổi Mới.

Yugoslavia

Hyperinflation in the Socialist Federal Republic of Yugoslavia happened before and during the period of breakup of Yugoslavia, from 1989 to 1991. In April 1992, one of its successor states, FR Yugoslavia, entered a period of hyperinflation in the Federal Republic of Yugoslavia, that lasted until 1994. One of several regional conflicts accompanying the dissolution of Yugoslavia was the Bosnian War (1992–1995). The Belgrade government of Slobodan Milošević backed ethnic Serbian forces in the conflict, resulting in a United Nations boycott of Yugoslavia. The UN boycott collapsed an economy already weakened by regional war, with the projected monthly inflation rate accelerating to one million percent by December 1993 (prices double every 2.3 days).

The highest denomination in 1988 was 50,000 DIN. By 1989, it was 2,000,000 DIN. In the 1990 currency reform, 1 new dinar was exchanged for 10,000 old dinars. After socialist Yugoslavia broke up, the 1992 currency reform in FR Yugoslavia led to 1 new dinar being exchanged for 10 old dinars. The highest denomination in 1992 was 50,000 DIN. By 1993, it was 10,000,000,000 DIN. In the 1993 currency reform, 1 new dinar was exchanged for 1,000,000 old dinars. Before the year was over, however, the highest denomination was 500,000,000,000 dinars. In the 1994 currency reform, 1 new dinar was exchanged for 1,000,000,000 old dinars. In another currency reform a month later, 1 novi dinar was exchanged for 13 million dinars (1 novi dinar = 1 Deutschmark at the time of exchange). The overall impact of hyperinflation was that 1 novi dinar was equal to 1 × 1027 – 1.3 × 1027 pre-1990 dinars. Yugoslavia's rate of inflation hit 5 × 1015% cumulative inflation over the time period 1 October 1993 and 24 January 1994. 

SFR Yugoslavia:
 Start and End Date: Sept. 1989 – Dec. 1989
 Peak month and rate of inflation: December 1989, 59.7%
FR Yugoslavia:
 Start and end date: April 1992 – January 1994
 Peak month and rate of inflation: January 1994, %

Zimbabwe

Hyperinflation in Zimbabwe was one of the few instances that resulted in the abandonment of the local currency. At independence in 1980, the Zimbabwe dollar (ZWD) was worth about US$1.25. Afterwards, however, rampant inflation and the collapse of the economy severely devalued the currency. Inflation was relatively steady until the early 1990s when economic disruption caused by failed land reform agreements and rampant government corruption resulted in reductions in food production and the decline of foreign investment. Several multinational companies began hoarding retail goods in warehouses in Zimbabwe and just south of the border, preventing commodities from becoming available on the market. The result was that to pay its expenditures Mugabe's government and Gideon Gono's Reserve Bank printed more and more notes with higher face values.

Hyperinflation began early in the 21st century, reaching 624% in 2004. It fell back to low triple digits before surging to a new high of 1,730% in 2006. The Reserve Bank of Zimbabwe revalued on 1 August 2006 at a ratio of 1,000 ZWD to each second dollar (ZWN), but year-to-year inflation rose by June 2007 to 11,000% (versus an earlier estimate of 9,000%). Larger denominations were progressively issued in 2008:
 5 May: banknotes or "bearer cheques" for the value of Z$100 million and Z$250 million.
 15 May: new bearer cheques with a value of Z$500 million (then equivalent to about US$2.50).
 20 May: a new series of notes ("agro cheques") in denominations of Z$5 billion, Z$25 billion and Z$50 billion.
 21 July: a "special agro-cheque" for Z$100 billion.

Inflation by 16 July officially surged to 2,200,000% with some analysts estimating figures surpassing 9,000,000%. As of 22 July 2008 the value of the Zimbabwe dollar fell to approximately Z$688 billion per US$1, or Z$688 trillion in pre-August 2006 Zimbabwean dollars.

On 1 August 2008, the Zimbabwe dollar was redenominated at the ratio of  ZWN to each third dollar (ZWR). On 19 August 2008, official figures announced for June estimated the inflation over 11,250,000%. Zimbabwe's annual inflation was 231,000,000% in July (prices doubling every 17.3 days). By October 2008 Zimbabwe was mired in hyperinflation with wages falling far behind inflation. In this dysfunctional economy hospitals and schools had chronic staffing problems, because many nurses and teachers could not afford bus fare to work. Most of the capital of Harare was without water because the authorities had stopped paying the bills to buy and transport the treatment chemicals. Desperate for foreign currency to keep the government functioning, Zimbabwe's central bank governor, Gideon Gono, sent runners into the streets with suitcases of Zimbabwean dollars to buy up American dollars and South African rand.

For periods after July 2008, no official inflation statistics were released. Prof. Steve H. Hanke overcame the problem by estimating inflation rates after July 2008 and publishing the Hanke Hyperinflation Index for Zimbabwe. Prof. Hanke's HHIZ measure indicated that the inflation peaked at an annual rate of 89.7 sextillion percent (89,700,000,000,000,000,000,000%, or %) in mid-November 2008. The peak monthly rate was 79.6 billion percent, which is equivalent to a 98% daily rate, or around % yearly rate. At that rate, prices were doubling every 24.7 hours. Note that many of these figures should be considered mostly theoretical since hyperinflation did not proceed at this rate over a whole year.

At its November 2008 peak, Zimbabwe's rate of inflation approached, but failed to surpass, Hungary's July 1946 world record. On 2 February 2009, the dollar was redenominated for the third time at the ratio of  ZWR to 1 ZWL, only three weeks after the Z$100 trillion banknote was issued on 16 January, but hyperinflation waned by then as official inflation rates in USD were announced and foreign transactions were legalised, and on 12 April the Zimbabwe dollar was abandoned in favour of using only foreign currencies. The overall impact of hyperinflation was US$1 = Z$.
 Start and end date: March 2007 – mid November 2008
 Peak month and rate of inflation: mid November 2008, %
Ironically, following the abandonment of the ZWR and subsequent use of reserve currencies, banknotes from the hyperinflation period of the old Zimbabwe dollar began attracting international attention as collectors items, having accrued numismatic value, selling for prices many orders of magnitude higher than their old purchasing power.

Examples of high inflation

Countries have experienced periods of very high inflation, that did not reach hyperinflation, as defined as a monthly inflation rate exceeding 50% per month.

Imperial China
As the first user of fiat currency, China was also the first country to experience high inflation. Paper currency was introduced during the Tang Dynasty, and was generally welcomed. It maintained its value, as successive Chinese governments put in place strict controls on issuance. The convenience of paper currency for trade purposes led to strong demand for paper currency. It was only when discipline on quantity supplied broke down that inflation emerged. The Yuan Dynasty (1271–1368) was the first to print large amounts of fiat paper money to fund its wars, resulting in very high inflation.

Ancient Rome
During the Crisis of the Third Century, Rome underwent high inflation caused by years of coinage devaluation.

Argentina

Argentina has an economic history of very high inflation since World War II, mostly caused by excessive money supply increases. The Latin American debt crisis was caused by foreign debt held in other currencies, and exploded because the floating exchange rates depreciated the Argentinian currencies because of inflation, capital flight, and not enough foreign reserve currencies ratio.

Holy Roman Empire

Between 1620 and 1622 the Kreuzer fell from 1 Reichsthaler to 124 Kreuzer in end of 1619 to 1 Reichstaler to over 600 (regionally over 1000) Kreuzer in end of 1622, during the Thirty Years' War. This is a monthly inflation rate of over 20.6% (regionally over 34.4%).

Brazil

After the Military dictatorship in Brazil ended in 1985 and its transition to democracy.  Tancredo Neves dies shortly after winning the 1985 Brazilian presidential election and his Vice President José Sarney becomes president.  In 1986 inflation was already at 400% annually and Sarney tried to remedy inflation with a wage freeze, price controls, and reforming the currency by dropping three zeros from it, all while tripling the money supply to fund government expenditures and public sector that was consuming 50% of GDP at the time. Bank loans had an interest rate of around 25% a month to maintain a positive real yield during inflation.  In February 1987 the government defaulted on $110 billion in foreign loans, that was part of the Latin American debt crisis.

Iraq
Between 1987 and 1995 the Iraqi Dinar went from an official value of 0.306 Dinars/USD (or US$3.26 per dinar, though the black market rate is thought to have been substantially lower) to 3,000 dinars/USD due to government printing of tens of trillions of dinars starting with a base of only tens of billions. That equates to approximately 315% inflation per year averaged over that eight-year period.

Mexico

In spite of increased oil prices in the late 1970s (Mexico is a producer and exporter), Mexico defaulted on its external debt in 1982. As a result, the country suffered a severe case of capital flight and several years of acute inflation and peso devaluation, leading to an accumulated inflation rate of almost 27,000% between December 1975 and late 1988. On 1 January 1993, Mexico created a new currency, the nuevo peso ("new peso", or MXN), which chopped three zeros off the old peso (One new peso was equal to 1,000 old MXP pesos).

Nicaragua

After the Nicaraguan Revolution in 1979 where the communist Sandinista National Liberation Front ousted the Somoza dictatorship, the economy contracted by 34 percent during that time. The Sandinistas nationalized many industries and had expansive monetary policy that started to contribute to rising inflation. Fighting with the Contras and the United States embargo against Nicaragua in May 1985 also contributed to the problem.  Inflation hit 10,000% in 1988.

Ecuador

Between 1998 and 1999, Ecuador faced a period of economic instability that resulted from a combined banking crisis, currency crisis, and sovereign debt crisis. Severe inflation and devaluation of the Ecuadorean Sucre lead to President Jamil Mahuad announcing on 9 January 2000 that the US dollar would be adopted as the national currency.

Despite the government's efforts to curb inflation, the Sucre depreciated rapidly at the end of 1999, resulting in widespread informal use of U.S. dollars in the financial system. As a last resort to prevent hyperinflation, the government formally adopted the U.S. dollar in January 2000. The stability of the new currency was a necessary first step towards economic recovery, but the exchange rate was fixed at 25,000:1, which resulted in great losses of wealth.

Roman Egypt
In Roman Egypt, where the best documentation on pricing has survived, the price of a measure of wheat was 200 drachmae in 276 AD, and increased to more than 2,000,000 drachmae in 334 AD, roughly 1,000,000% inflation in a span of 58 years.

Although the price increased by a factor of 10,000 over 58 years, the annual rate of inflation was only 17.2% (1.4% monthly) compounded.

Romania
Romania experienced high inflation in the 1990s. The highest denomination in 1990 was 100 lei and in 1998 was 100,000 lei. By 2000 it was 500,000 lei. In early 2005 it was 1,000,000 lei. In July 2005 the lei was replaced by the new leu at 10,000 old lei = 1 new leu. Inflation in 2005 was 9%. In July 2005 the highest denomination became 500 lei (= 5,000,000 old lei).

Russian Federation

In the transition from the Soviet Union planned economy and price controls to a free market economy there were substantial imbalances in supply and demand.  The Government increased the money supply by eighteen times by the end of 1992.  A lot of corruption from Government enterprises taking up debt and getting bailed out from the government.  The Federal budget deficit was 20 percent of GDP in 1992, mostly financed by increasing money supply. This resulted in an inflation rate of over 2,000% in 1992.

Transnistria
The Second Transnistrian ruble consisted solely of banknotes and suffered from high inflation, necessitating the issue of notes overstamped with higher denominations. 1 and sometimes 10 rubles become 10,000 rubles, 5 rubles become 50,000 and 10 rubles become 100,000 rubles. In 2000, a new ruble was introduced at a rate of 1 new ruble = 1,000,000 old rubles.

United States
During the Revolutionary War, when the Continental Congress authorized the printing of paper called continental currency, the monthly inflation rate reached a peak of 47% in November 1779 (Bernholz 2003: 48). These notes depreciated rapidly, giving rise to the expression "not worth a continental". One cause of the inflation was counterfeiting by the British, who ran a press on HMS Phoenix, moored in New York Harbor. The counterfeits were advertised and sold almost for the price of the paper they were printed on.

During the U.S. Civil War between January 1861 and April 1865, the Confederate States decided to finance the war by printing money. The Lerner Commodity Price Index of leading cities in the eastern Confederacy states subsequently increased from 100 to 9,200 in that time. In the final months of the Civil War, the Confederate dollar was almost worthless. Similarly, the Union government inflated its greenbacks, with the monthly rate peaking at 40% in March 1864 (Bernholz 2003: 107).

Ten most severe hyperinflations in world history

Units of inflation
Inflation rate is usually measured in percent per year. It can also be measured in percent per month or in price doubling time.

Often, at redenominations, three zeroes are cut from the bills. It can be read from the table that if the (annual) inflation is for example 100%, it takes 3.32 years to produce one more zero on the price tags, or 3 × 3.32 = 9.96 years to produce three zeroes. Thus can one expect a redenomination to take place about 9.96 years after the currency was introduced.

See also
 Blockade
 Chronic inflation
 Currency crisis
 Debt
 Fiat money
 The collection of precious metals for financial purposes, including as a hedge against inflation:
 Gold as an investment
 Silver as an investment
 Platinum as an investment
 Palladium as an investment
 Hoarding (economics)
 Hyperstagflation
 Inflation accounting
 Inflationism
 Inflation hedge
 Liberty dollar (private currency)
 Negative interest rates
 Outline of economics
 Zero stroke

Notes

References

Further reading

 
 Cagan, Phillip, "The Monetary Dynamics of Hyperinflation." In Milton Friedman, ed., Studies in the Quantity Theory of Money. Chicago: University of Chicago Press, 1956.
 Shun-Hsin Chou, The Chinese Inflation 1937–1949, New York, Columbia University Press, 1963, Library of Congress Cat. 62–18260.
  a popular description of the 1789–1799 inflation
 Wolfgang Chr. Fischer (Editor), "German Hyperinflation 1922/23 – A Law and Economics Approach", Eul Verlag, Köln, Germany 2010.

External links

 Wheelbarrows of Money: 5 Times Currencies Crashed at Commodity.com

Economic collapses
Financial crises
Inflation